Steve Koren is an American writer/producer and screenwriter.  Most notably, he has written for Saturday Night Live, Seinfeld, and Veep.  He also wrote or co-wrote the movies Bruce Almighty, Click, A Night at the Roxbury, and Superstar.

In addition, he has contributed to Curb Your Enthusiasm (specifically, the "Palestinian Chicken" episode).

Koren is a native of Queens, New York, and attended Benjamin N. Cardozo High School in Bayside, Queens.

Career 
After college, he began his career as an NBC page.  Among his duties as a page was working for Saturday Night Live. As a Rockefeller Center tour guide, Koren would hand jokes to David Letterman and Dennis Miller as they passed in the hall, which landed him a writing gig on SNL. He also occasionally acted for the series.

While at SNL, he wrote/co-wrote Weekend Update, Mary Katherine Gallagher, The Roxbury Guys, Adam Sandler’s The Denise Show, The Joe Pesci Show, Jim Carrey’s Hot Tub Lifeguard, among many other sketches.

In addition, he helped write and performed on Adam Sandler’s Platinum debut album They’re All Gonna Laugh at You.

Later, he became a writer for Seinfeld, and wrote the episodes "The Abstinence", "The English Patient", "The Serenity Now", and "The Dealership". He was also one of the contributors to the teleplay for "The Frogger" and "The Puerto Rican Day".

In the episode "The Van Buren Boys", a character named Steve Koren is George Costanza's choice for the first Susan Biddle Ross Scholarship to be granted by the Susan Ross Foundation.

Koren has executive-produced several films such as Adam Sandler's Grown Ups (2010), Just Go with It (2011), Blended (2014), and Pixels (2015).  Koren also wrote the movie Superstar, starring Molly Shannon and Will Ferrell.

Filmography

Writing credits
Saturday Night Live (TV) (1991–1998)
Seinfeld (TV) (1996–1998)
A Night at the Roxbury (1998) (co-written with Will Ferrell and Chris Kattan)
Superstar (1999) (written as Steven Wayne Koren)
Everything But the Girl (TV movie) (2001)
Bruce Almighty (2003) (co-written with Mark O'Keefe and Steve Oedekerk)
Click (2006) (co-written with Mark O'Keefe)
Fishy (short film) (2006)
Jack and Jill (2011) (co-written with Adam Sandler and Robert Smigel)
A Thousand Words (2012)
Veep (2016)

Acting credits
Seinfeld:
"The Millennium" (May 1, 1997) - as the character Steve Koren"The Dealership" (January 8, 1998) - as the Cab Driver"The Finale" (May 14, 1998) - as a Juror
Fishy (short film) (2006) - as Dad
 Pixels (film) (2015) - as White House Reporter #3

Awards and nominations 

Emmy Award nominee (1992, 1993) for Outstanding Individual Achievement in Writing in a Variety or Music Program; the nomination was shared with other writers for Saturday Night Live
Emmy Award nominee (1998) for Outstanding Comedy Series; the nomination was shared with other writers for Seinfeld

References

External links 

20th-century American screenwriters
20th-century American male writers
21st-century American screenwriters
21st-century American male writers
American male screenwriters
American male television writers
American television writers
Benjamin N. Cardozo High School alumni
Binghamton University alumni
Living people
People from Bayside, Queens
Screenwriters from New York (state)
Writers from Queens, New York
Year of birth missing (living people)